A cookie cutter is used to cut cookies into a particular shape.

The term may also refer to:

 Cookie cutter neighbourhood, see Tract housing
 Cucoloris, a device for creating patterned illumination
 Cookie Cutter, album by Jim Blanco

See also 
 Cookiecutter shark
 Cookie-cutter stadium
 Cookie-cutter campaign